Robert Simon Beecham (born February 1951) is a British businessman who secured the first Star Wars product license in Europe in 1977. He sold out to Hasbro in 2002 to become a property developer.

Early life 
Robert Simon Beecham was born in February 1951.

Career 
Beecham secured the first Star Wars product license in Europe in 1977. He sold out to U.S. toy company Hasbro in 2002 to become a property developer and in that capacity is a director of Latitude Investments Limited and associated companies. He also started a designer toy company known as Dudebox.

Personal life
Robert Beecham is married to Claire Beecham. They are trustees of the Claire and Robert Beecham Charitable Trust. The couple live in Primrose Hill, London. In November 2015, Beecham's plan to rebuild his current home and extend it underground with what was described as "London's biggest basement", was subject to criticism by some of his neighbours.

References

External links 
Robert and Claire Beecham talking about Dudebox.

British businesspeople
Living people
1951 births